In international law, a mandate is a binding obligation issued from an inter-governmental organization (e.g. the United Nations) to a country which is bound to follow the instructions of the organization.

Before the creation of the United Nations, all mandates were issued from the League of Nations. An example of such a mandate would be Australian New Guinea, which is officially the Territory of Papua.

See also
 UN Mandate
 League of Nations mandate

International law
Law of obligations